The 1986–87 New York Islanders season was the 15th season for the franchise in the National Hockey League.

Offseason

NHL draft

Regular season

Season standings

Schedule and results

Player statistics

Note: Pos = Position; GP = Games played; G = Goals; A = Assists; Pts = Points; +/- = plus/minus; PIM = Penalty minutes; PPG = Power-play goals; SHG = Short-handed goals; GWG = Game-winning goals
      MIN = Minutes played; W = Wins; L = Losses; T = Ties; GA = Goals-against; GAA = Goals-against average; SO = Shutouts; SA = Shots against; SV = Shots saved; SV% = Save percentage;

Playoffs

Round 1: New York Islanders (3) vs. Washington Capitals (2)

The Easter Epic is the nickname given to a National Hockey League Stanley Cup Playoff game between the New York Islanders and Washington Capitals, played April 18–19, 1987, at the Capital Centre in Landover, Maryland. It is so named because the game started on Saturday evening but did not finish until the early hours of Easter Sunday where Pat Lafontaine scored the overtime series winning goal.

Round 2: New York Islanders (3) vs. Philadelphia Flyers (1)

References
 Islanders on Hockey Database

New York Islanders seasons
New York Islanders
New York Islanders
New York Islanders
New York Islanders